Cultus Lake is a natural lake in Deschutes County in the U.S. state of Oregon. Formed by a glacier, it is located in the high Cascade Range in the Deschutes National Forest. The name is from the Chinook Jargon and means variously bad or worthless, or simply "in vain".
In the early 19th century, the lakes in this area abounded with beavers. The earliest explorers to this area were primarily on a quest for furs.

Description

Cultus Lake lies at the base of the Cultus Mountain. Several species of fish inhabit the lake, including rainbow trout, lake trout (mackinaw) and brook trout.

The lake also receives several streams inhabited by younger fish. The largest is Winopee Creek, which enters through the marsh on the northwestern side, a popular fly fishing spot. Two miles south is a smaller lake called Little Cultus Lake. The two lakes are divided by Cultus Mountain.  The lake empties to the east via Cultus Creek, which flows into Crane Prairie Reservoir.

However, according to the U.S. Fish and Wildlife Service, the large pines are being weakened by competing understory fir trees and mountain pine beetle attacks. If the trend is not reversed, there will be a shift in tree species (and tree size) from pine and Douglas-fir to white fir.

The service recommends the selective thinning of white fir understory trees around selected ponderosa and western white pine to increase light, and the availability of nutrients, allowing the selected pines to grow more vigorously and increase their resistance to bark beetles.

Management policies

The Oregon Department of Fish and Wildlife manages the lake for the natural and hatchery production of rainbow trout and brook trout.  They also manage the natural production of Mountain Whitefish and lake trout.

Amenities
Cultus is a recreational lake and is also popular for water skiing, sailing, jet skiing and boating.

The lake has a resort with 23 cabins and a lodge with a restaurant and a store. There are also three other campsites for people to set up tents or park RVs.

See also
 List of lakes in Oregon

References

External links

 Deschutes National Forest

Lakes of Oregon
Chinook Jargon place names
Lakes of Deschutes County, Oregon
Protected areas of Deschutes County, Oregon
Deschutes National Forest